The Battle of Miranda was the final battle of the Paraguayan War between Brazilian and Paraguayan soldiers from April 4 to 8, 1870 before the final organized Paraguayan force surrendered.

Background
The Paraguayan general and about 100 soldiers crossed the Paraguayan-Brazilian border across the Apa River on February 12. The news of Solano López's defeat did not reach general Caballero, and he continued the search for provisions throughout March. During the Battle at Cerro Corá, a force detached from the column of general José Antônio Correia da Câmara, under the command of Bento Martins de Meneses, was assigned to close the siege of López on the Apa River, to prevent the Paraguayan president from escaping there.

The Battle
With López's death, the war was officially declared over. However, colonel Martins' Brazilian forces turned against the Paraguayans who were in Brazilian territory. Bernardino Caballero was close to the Military Colony of Miranda on a farm known as Cândido Oliveira. On 4 April 1870, Brazilian troops found them there and launched an attack, defeating them and some remaining fleeing the battlefield. In the rush to flee, general Bernardino Caballero lost his sword as colonel Martins' forces went after the Paraguayans. A division of these forces, under the leadership of major Francisco Marques Xavier, encountered general Caballero and 54 remaining of his column near the village of Bela Vista on the 8th. Brazilian troops were preparing to attack when the Paraguayan general decided to surrender after being convinced of the death of marshal Solano López. These were the last Paraguayans to surrender.

References

Bibliography

Conflicts in 1870
Battles of the Paraguayan War
Battles involving Brazil
Battles involving Paraguay
April 1870 events
1870 in Paraguay
History of Mato Grosso do Sul